Alexander Marček (born 11 September 1968) is a Slovak swimmer. He competed for Czechoslovakia in two events at the 1988 Summer Olympics.

References

External links
 
 

1968 births
Living people
Slovak male swimmers
Olympic swimmers of Czechoslovakia
Swimmers at the 1988 Summer Olympics
Sportspeople from Martin, Slovakia